Robert "Rob" Hitchcock (born October 28, 1970) is a former linebacker and safety who played in the Canadian Football League. He played for his hometown Hamilton Tiger-Cats from 1995 to 2006 and the Edmonton Eskimos in 2007.  On January 31, 2008, Hitchcock was released by the Eskimos.  Hitchcock is the Tiger-Cats' all-time leading tackler with a total of 484 tackles.  He also won a Grey Cup in 1999 with Hamilton.  Hitchcock played three seasons of college football at Weber State University.

References

1970 births
Living people
Canadian football defensive backs
Canadian football linebackers
Edmonton Elks players
Hamilton Tiger-Cats players
Weber State Wildcats football players
Sportspeople from Hamilton, Ontario
Players of Canadian football from Ontario